The tonsillar fossa (or tonsillar sinus) is a space delineated by the triangular fold (plica triangularis) of the palatoglossal and palatopharyngeal arches within the lateral wall of the oral cavity.

In many cases, however, this sinus is obliterated by its walls becoming adherent to the palatine tonsils.

References

External links
 Photo at usda.gov

Mouth